Carolina Guerra (born Carolina Liliana Guerra Molina; 30 July 1987) is a Colombian model, actress and television presenter chosen in 2005 to represent the nation's capital as Miss Bogotá. She won a Škoda Fabia hatchback, 25 million pesos with which to prepare for the national beauty competition in Cartagena, a gold tiara and a jewel.

She has presented the MTV programme Rock Dinner and appeared in the telenovelas Montecristo, broadcast in Colombia on Caracol TV, and La Diosa Coronada, broadcast in the United States on Telemundo. She played the Inca high priestess Ima in season two of Da Vinci's Demons. In her modelling work she is represented professionally by Stock Models International Model Management. She has hosted Colombia's Next Top Model. Guerra, alongside Olga Segura, starred in the 2015 lesbian romance drama The Firefly directed by Ana Maria Hermida.

References

External links
 

Living people
Colombian telenovela actresses
Colombian television presenters
1987 births
Colombian female models
Colombia's Next Top Model
Colombian women television presenters